Colette Revenu (born 14 September 1944) is a French fencer. She competed in the women's team foil event at the 1964 Summer Olympics.

References

External links
 

1944 births
Living people
French female foil fencers
Olympic fencers of France
Fencers at the 1964 Summer Olympics
Universiade medalists in fencing
Universiade bronze medalists for France
Medalists at the 1967 Summer Universiade